Chrostosoma cardinale is a moth of the subfamily Arctiinae. It was described by William Schaus in 1898. It is found in Colombia.

References

External links
Original description: Journal of the New York Entomological Society

Chrostosoma
Moths described in 1898